John Williamson  (born 1893) was an English footballer. His regular position was at full back. He was born in Manchester. He played for Manchester United and Bury.

External links
MUFCInfo.com profile

1893 births
English footballers
Manchester United F.C. players
Bury F.C. players
Year of death missing
Association football defenders